The 1997 IPB Czech Indoor was a men's tennis tournament played on indoor carpet courts at the ČEZ Aréna in Ostrava in the Czech Republic and was part of the World Series of the 1997 ATP Tour. It was the fourth edition of the tournament and was held from 13 October through 19 October 1997. Eighth-seeded Karol Kučera won the singles title.

Finals

Singles
 Karol Kučera defeated  Magnus Norman 6–2 retired
 It was Kučera's 1st singles title of the year and the 2nd of his career.

Doubles
 Jiří Novák /  David Rikl defeated  Donald Johnson /  Francisco Montana 6–2, 6–4

References

External links
 ITF tournament edition details

IPB Czech Indoor
Ostrava Open
1997 in Czech tennis